Michael F. Cannon is director of health policy studies at the Cato Institute, where he advocates for free-market healthcare, such as Medicare reform through "public option" principles and ending the tax exclusion for employer-sponsored health insurance. His most recent work includes a policy analysis entitled 'End the Tax Exclusion for Employer-Sponsored Health Insurance,' which quantifies the impact of Employer-Sponsored Health Insurance on employees. Cannon is also a contributor and speaker for the Federalist Society. Some of his work for the Federalist Society includes a teleforum on "Who Should Decide Whether Drugs Are Available Over-The-Counter or by prescription?" and speaking at a zoom webinar on FDA Policy and the COVID-19 Pandemic. Cannon is also a member of the Federalist Society Regulatory Transparency Project's FDA & Health Working Group.

In 2007 the second edition of Cannon's co-authored book Healthy Competition: What's Holding Back Health Care and How to Free It was published. This updated version expands upon the 2005 edition of the same name and offers a detailed analysis of health care reform. In 2013, he authored 50 Vetoes: How States Can Stop the Obama Health Care Law, describing Obamacare as "harmful, unstable, and unpopular." His criticisms of Obamacare and warnings about the detriments to affordable health care and health care access following the implementation of Obamacare have ignited descriptions of Cannon as "ObamaCare's single most relentless antagonist" and "ObamaCare's fiercest critic".

On September 26, 2013, Cannon spoke at the Pepperdine Caruso School of Law on the subject, "Obamacare and the Tax."

Education 
Cannon received his B.A. from the University of Virginia in American government, and his M.A. in economics and J.M. in law and economics from George Mason University.

Accolades 
Cannon's work has been referenced in numerous journals and publications, including The Washington Post, who described him as "an influential health care wonk at the libertarian Cato Institute," and "the premier libertarian Obamacare critic." The Washingtonian has also named Cannon "one of the 250 most influential people in Washington" in 2021 as well as one of "Washington, D.C.'s 500 most influential people" for 2022.

References

External links
 

Cato Institute people
Living people
University of Virginia alumni
George Mason University alumni
Antonin Scalia Law School alumni
Year of birth missing (living people)